Nefertari was a queen of the Eighteenth Dynasty of Egypt, the first Great Royal Wife of Pharaoh Thutmose IV.

Her origins are unknown - she was a commoner. On several depictions she and Queen Mother Tiaa are depicted as goddesses accompanying Thutmose. In the 7th year the new Great Royal Wife was Thutmose's sister Iaret; Nefertari died when Iaret was 13 years old and thus old enough to become Thutmose's wife.

She was depicted together with her husband before gods in Gizeh, on eight stelae. She was also shown on a stela found in the Luxor Temple and was mentioned on a scarab found in Gurob. Nefertari and Iaret died childless; after Thutmose's death the next pharaoh was Amenhotep III, the son of a secondary wife called Mutemwia.

Sources

15th-century BC Egyptian women
14th-century BC Egyptian women
Queens consort of the Eighteenth Dynasty of Egypt
Wives of Thutmose IV